Amra Kvarandzia is the current Minister for Finance of Abkhazia. Kvarandzia was appointed on 17 October 2014 by newly elected President Raul Khajimba.

References

Living people
Ministers for Finance of Abkhazia
Year of birth missing (living people)